The Overloon War Museum (Dutch: Oorlogsmuseum Overloon) is located in Overloon, Netherlands.

The museum was opened on May 25, 1946, making it one of the oldest museums in Europe dedicated to the Second World War. The museum is located on the site of the Battle of Overloon, a World War II tank and infantry battle between Allied and German forces that occurred in September and October 1944, in the aftermath of Operation Market Garden.

The museum is set in 14 hectares of woodland. A feature of the museum is the large number of military vehicles and equipment on display, both German and Allied.  For years these have been kept in the open air, but have recently been moved indoors in order to help preserve them. Many of the exhibited vehicles took part in the Battle of Overloon. In 2006 the collection was expanded with a large number of vehicles from a private collection.

During the 2021 Christmas period, while the museum was closed due to restrictions from the COVID-19 pandemic in the Netherlands, the museum released a series of videos about subjects in its collection. One of these videos was about Vincent Speranza, an American veteran of the Second World War.

See also
Verzetsmuseum – Amsterdam, Netherlands
Bundeswehr Museum of German Defense Technology – Koblenz, Germany
Deutsches Panzermuseum – Munster, Germany
Australian Armour and Artillery Museum – Australia
Musée des Blindés – Paris, France
Nationaal Militair Museum – Soesterberg, Netherlands
Royal Tank Museum – Amman, Jordan
The Tank Museum – Bovington, United Kingdom
United States Army Ordnance Museum
Polish Army Museum – Warsaw, Poland

References

External links
Overloon War Museum

World War II museums in the Netherlands
Open-air museums in the Netherlands
Military and war museums in the Netherlands
National museums of the Netherlands
Transport museums in the Netherlands
Tank museums
Museums in North Brabant
Buildings and structures in Land van Cuijk